The enzyme uronolactonase (EC 3.1.1.19) catalyzes the reaction

D-glucurono-6,2-lactone + H2O  D-glucuronate

This enzyme belongs to the family of hydrolases, specifically those acting on carboxylic ester bonds.  The systematic name is D-glucurono-6,2-lactone lactonohydrolase. It is also called glucuronolactonase.  It participates in ascorbate and aldarate metabolism.

References 

 

EC 3.1.1
Enzymes of unknown structure